Neal Rosenblum was shot and killed on Thursday, April 17, 1986 by Steven M. Tielsch in Pittsburgh. The attack was motivated by antisemitic hate.

Background 
Neal Rosenblum was the third of five children in an Orthodox Jewish family in Toronto, Canada. He was a rabbinical and computer science student. He married Manya Weingarten of the Squirrel Hill neighborhood of Pittsburgh in the spring of 1985. As a devout Orthodox Jew, he prayed three times daily, attending services at synagogue or at Jewish schools.

A month after their daughter was born, the family visited Mrs. Rosenblum's parents, intending to stay for Passover.

Rosenblum was 24 or 25 years old at the time.

The murder and immediate aftermath 
A few hours after arriving at his in-laws' house in Squirrel Hill, Rosenblum went to pray the evening services at the Kollel Bais Yitzchok Torah Institute Study Center. As he walked home from the synagogue, a car pulled up, and the passenger engaged him in conversation. The passenger then shot him five times. He was killed because of his Jewish appearance, wearing Haredi attire such as a black fedora.

Rosenblum was still conscious when emergency workers arrived, and he provided some details of the attack. He died about five hours later while in surgery at University of Pittsburgh Medical Center.

Investigators were unable to develop leads for 12 years.

Development of case 
In 1988, Tielsch and Sanford Gordon shared a cell in the Allegheny County jail, both on separate drug charges. Tielsch bragged that he had killed a Jew, and would often make antisemitic remarks and draw swastikas, a common antisemitic symbol, on himself. Gordon reported the information to the authorities, but they did not have enough evidence to make the case in 2000. At that time, the Cold Case Squad took over the investigation and got a corroborating witness. Twelve years after the original crime, police arrested the now 45-year-old killer.

Trials 
Gordon was the star witness in all the trials. In the first three trials, an extensive roster of witnesses was used, many of them jailhouse informants or otherwise unsavory characters. For the fourth trial, the prosecutor streamlined the case, using more technologically advanced presentation such as PowerPoint and far fewer witnessess, concluding the proceedings in half the amount of time.

Tielsch's leg tattoo of a swastika was not admitted into evidence. His attorney argued that it could not be proven that he had already had the swastika at the time of the murder.

Tielsch's first three trials ended in a deadlocked jury. He was convicted of third-degree murder in a fourth trial in 2002, with a sentence of 10 to 20 years. The judge in the latter trial, Lawrence O'Toole, declared that the jury was giving the defendant a break by limiting charges to 3rd degree murder. The Supreme Court of Pennsylvania upheld the decision in 2007.

Tielsch was released from prison on October 23, 2017, after serving 15 years of the maximum 20.

Media 
The prosecutorial doggedness in pursuing multiple trials generated controversy. The prosecutor explained it as due to the heinous nature of a hate crime, while the local newspaper rejected hate crimes as deserving special treatment. The newspaper's response drew public criticism.

After the Pittsburgh synagogue mass shooting in 2018 that killed 11 and injured 6, major media revisited the Rosenblum murder, which was also an anti-Semitic shooting attack that took place in the same neighborhood, and one in which the shooter also had no relationship with the victim.

See also
 Murder of Blaze Bernstein
 Lynching of Leo Frank
 History of the Jews in Pittsburgh
 History of antisemitism in the United States
 Poway synagogue shooting
 Los Angeles Jewish Community Center shooting
 Overland Park Jewish Community Center shooting
 Atlanta Hebrew Benevolent Congregation Temple bombing
 United States Holocaust Memorial Museum shooting
 Seattle Jewish Federation shooting
 List of synagogue shootings

References

1986 murders in the United States
Antisemitic attacks and incidents in the United States
Antisemitism in Pennsylvania
Deaths by firearm in Pennsylvania
Murder in Pennsylvania
White nationalism in Pennsylvania